Barbie Dreamtopia, Barbie: Dreamtopia or simply Dreamtopia, is a web-based children's media franchise created by Julia Pistor for Mattel Television (previously Mattel Creations) which was active from 14 January 2016 to 21 October 2021.

The original Dreamtopia franchise was produced by Israeli animation studio Snowball Studios with support from The Jerusalem Film & Television Fund. from its beginning on 14 January 2016 until 1 April 2018. Toronto-based Relish Studios produced an 8-part mini-serial spin-off of the franchise titled Barbie Return to Dreamtopia as an part of a broader 3D CGI-animated web franchise known as Barbie's Dreamworld which was released by Mattel Television on YouTube Kids and YouTube, the latter via its Barbie user handle, between 21 July and 21 October 2021.

Premise
The series follows Chelsea Roberts as she finds herself touring her own make-believe land known as Dreamtopia with her elder sister, Barbie. There, they discover a whole new munch-able world; swim through rainbow rivers with small mermaids and fly through cotton candy clouds with fairies.

Broadcast
Dreamtopia began with the release of a teaser promo video on 14 January 2016. The shorts then followed from 5 May to 21 July 2016 and was initially released as a YouTube Kids-exclusive production, but was later made available on YouTube. A 2D computer-animated television special spanning 46 minutes in length was distributed by Universal Pictures Home Entertainment and broadcast on television in 5 countries and regions on 26 June 2016. The success of the TV special resulted in the greenlighting of an eponymous web series, with four episodes released early on YouTube and YouTube Kids on 4 May 2017. The web series episodes began releasing weekly on YouTube and YouTube Kids from 5 November 2017 to 1 April 2018. Barbie Dreamtopia: The Series  premiered on Cartoon Network in Australia and New Zealand on 2 March 2018. The series also premiered on Kabillion in the United States on 7 September 2018

Main characters
 Chelsea (voiced by Meira Bilnkoff): Barbie's little sister and the focus of the franchise.
 Honey (voiced by Lucien Dodge): Chelsea's puppy.
 Otto / Notto Prince (voiced by Addie Chandler) is Chelsea's neighbor. In Dreamtopia, his character is Notto Prince.
 Barbie (voiced by Erica Lindbeck): Chelsea's older sister.

Shorts
The Barbie: Dreamtopia franchise overall was centered on a series of 2D-oriented computer-animated shorts released exclusively on YouTube between 5 May and 21 July 2016.

Television film
An eponymous television film spanning 46 minutes in length was released on 26 June 2016 by Universal Pictures Home Entertainment and broadcast on television in 5 countries and territories including Cartoon Network in Latin America, Super RTL in Germany, Pop in the UK and Ireland, MiniMini+ in Poland, Karusel in Russia and Media Prima in Malaysia.

Barbie Dreamtopia: Festival of Fun
The web-based special, Festival of Fun, was released on 4 May 2017 on YouTube and its affiliate mobile app. It is a compilation of the first four episodes of Dreamtopia: The Series ahead of its official debut in November that year.

The Series
During MIPCOM 2016, Mattel Creations announced the greenlighting of an eponymous web series and afterwards on YouTube via its Barbie user handle on 12 October 2016, citing the success of the television film special released on 26 June as the reason. It is, like the franchise overall, created by Julia Pistor with assistance from Saul Blinkoff and majority-directed by Eran Lazar. This web series, like the earlier web shorts, was first released on YouTube Kids and to YouTube itself afterwards from 5 November 2017 to 1 April 2018.

The series debuted on American television via children's programming block KidsClick from Sinclair Broadcast Group on 24 September 2018 and on South African television via eToonz on 25 March 2019.

References

See also

Barbie television series
Mass media franchises
2010s English-language films
Television series by Mattel Creations